This is a general glossary of the terminology used in the sport of cricket. Where words in a sentence are also defined elsewhere in this article, they appear in italics. Certain aspects of cricket terminology are explained in more detail in cricket statistics and the naming of fielding positions is explained at fielding (cricket).

Cricket is known for its rich terminology. Some terms are often thought to be arcane and humorous by those not familiar with the game.


A

B

 

{{defn|defn= a protective item shaped like a half-shell and inserted into the front pouch of a jockstrap with cup pocket worn underneath a player's (particularly a batsman's) trousers to protect their genitalia from the hard cricket ball. Also known as an abdominal protector, Hector protector, ball box, protector, athletic cup, protective cup or cup.}}

C

D

E

F

 Such unintentional shots can frequently fool the wicket keeper and may often fortunately result in runs.

G

H

I

J

K

L

M

N

O

P

. 2. Can also refer to a bowler pushing the ball through, meaning they bowl it quicker (usually said of a spinner). See darting the ball in. }}

Q

R

[[File:GandM Purist 156g cricket ball n02.jpg|thumb|right|A red ball]]

S

T

U

V

W

Y

Z

Notes

References

Printed sources:
 
 Booth, Lawrence Arm-ball to Zooter. A sideways look at the language of cricket, pub. 2006, Penguin. 
 
 Rundell, Michael The Wisden Dictionary of Cricket, Third edition, A & C Black, London, 2006. 
 Piesse, Ken the Extraordinary Book of Australian Cricket, Penguin, Australia.

Websites:
 A glossary of cricket terms from CricInfo
 Glossary of cricket terms from the England Cricket Board
 Cricket Academy – Glossary from BBC News
 "fielding positions" from CricInfo

Cricket
Terms
 
Cricket
Wikipedia glossaries using description lists